Papakura railway station is a railway station in Papakura, New Zealand, on the Southern Line of the Auckland railway network.

History 
The station was opened on 20 May 1875, as part of the Auckland and Mercer Railway on 20 May 1875, built by Brogden & Co, when it was extended from Penrose. On 2 October 1874 a deputation asked for the contractor to run trains from Penrose to Papakura and some services were available from October 1874. For example, Brogden & Sons ran excursion trains to Drury that month.

Initially Papakura was served by 2 trains a day. Papakura became the terminus of an improved suburban service in 1913. WAB Class locomotives were introduced to suburban services in 1922, but the coaching stock appears from photos to have been unchanged in 1966. With double tracking, suburban trains were speeded up in 1931, the fastest taking 49 minutes. Suburban Sunday trains at low fares were introduced in 1933. From 1938 to 1950 many trains carried troops to and from the Military Camp.

Plantations were established near many railway stations for beautification and, possibly, to provide timber for railway construction. Papakura's railway reserve was planted in 1883, with oaks and blue gums, and was protected in 1935. It was renamed Massey Park in 1939. Some of the trees remain.

From 1882 to 1913 a Post Office was run by railway staff. In 1885 the station was moved  to the other side of the line. A verandah was added in 1905, sheep yards in 1911 and an engine shed between 1913 and 1917.

In 1920 the first sod was turned for a new station. By 1922 only the overhead footbridges were unfinished and the old building was being removed. Electric replaced oil lamps in 1926. With increasing suburban traffic, work started in 1938 on a new ticket office, carpark, bridge and platform. On 9 September 1940 a new  suburban platform on the west of the station was brought into use. The station building was again rebuilt in 1983.

Tablet instruments were installed in 1904, fixed signals in 1905, distant signals in 1916 and electric interlocked signalling in 1927.

Duplication of the tracks between Papatoetoe and Papakura started in 1929 as an employment relief scheme and was completed on 29 March 1931. Doubling between Papakura and Paerata was completed on 3 December 1939.

On 3 November 1986 Papakura closed to goods traffic, but re-opened temporarily in 1987 to take glass for recycling. A report in 1987 said the goods shed and a shunting tractor had been removed, but another in 1990 said there was a goods shed.

Prior to October 2012, the station had an island platform between the main lines, complete with original wooden station building and signal panel, and a suburban side platform to the west. It had a bowstring footbridge connecting the platforms, which dated from at least the 1930s, constructed of old railway iron and sleepers.

Upgrades 
In 2007, the island platform was extended to the north, and new shelters were installed. Sidings were commissioned at the east of the station yard for stabling trains overnight. The heritage footbridge was demolished and scrapped, despite some local opposition, and replaced with a concrete bridge with two passenger lifts.

The upgrade cost NZ$4,900,000 and was paid for as part of the Auckland Regional Transport Authority's (ARTA) system-wide upgrade of stations. Platforms were lengthened to enable six-car trains, because of anticipated growth in passenger numbers. 3,000 people passed through each day as of 2007, and another thousand were anticipated to use the station within five years. The new station was the seventh station to be redeveloped by ARTA in 2007.

In 2012–2013, KiwiRail funded a significant upgrade as part of the Auckland Electrification Project, and to provide resiliency for suburban trains and freight trains heading south. The signalling was completely replaced; the signal panel had been commissioned over 80 years ago. The heritage station building was relocated to the western suburban platform, Platform 3, on 11 August 2012. The building was refurbished and restored, and contains the preserved signal panel on display, a ticket office, public toilets and space for a coffee kiosk.

The North Island Main Trunk has been slewed to the east, with the island Platforms 1 and 2 adjacent to the Up main line to Auckland, typically serving suburban trains from Britomart to Pukekohe. The western suburban Platform 3 has been lengthened, and a new bay platform 4 at its southern extremity will serve DMU shuttles to Pukekohe.

Bus stops are directly outside the ticket office, with the old bus stops on the station side of Railway Street West now only used for intercity services, and "rail buses" that operate when the railway network is shut down.

Gallery

Services

Rail
The station is the terminus for suburban passenger trains on the Southern Line, which was electrified in 2015. An hourly diesel train shuttle service runs between Papakura and Pukekohe on non-electrified track using DMUs.

The station is the terminus of the revived Waikato Connection, the Te Huia.

In May 2012, Auckland Transport's board included an investigation to extend electrified services to Pukekohe in its 10-year integrated transport plan. In April 2018, it was announced that electrification would be extended south to Pukekohe; see Auckland railway electrification.

Buses
Papakura is served by bus routes 33, 365, 372, 373, 376, 377 and 378.

See also 
 List of Auckland railway stations
 Public transport in Auckland

References

External links
 1947 aerial photo of station and Massey Park trees
1950s photo of turntable
1954 photo showing trees, goods shed, main line island platform and diesel train at suburban platform
1957 photo showing 2 footbridges and the suburban platform loop
1970s photo of station building
1976 suburban fare table

Rail transport in Auckland
Railway stations in New Zealand
Railway stations opened in 1875
Buildings and structures in Auckland